Tong is a district of Issyk-Kul Region in north-eastern Kyrgyzstan. The seat lies at Bökönbaev. Tong District borders Issyk-Kul District to the north-west, Jeti-Ögüz District to the south and south-east, Kochkor District to the south-west, Naryn District to the south, Kemin District to the north-west, and Issyk Kul - to the north.

Geography
The district is located between the southern shore of Issyk-Kul lake and Teskey Ala-Too Range and features natural passage from the depression to the west through the Boom Gorge. The foothills of the range are composed of Mesozoic and Cenozoic deposits, and severely dissected by gullies, ravines and river valleys. The lake area extends with lakeside planes and river fans, sometimes interrupted by foothill ridges. Syrts stretch to the south of Teskey Ala-Too Range. Approximately 89% of the district is occupied by mountains, and 11% - by valleys. The hydrological conditions are dominated by Tong river, Ak-Sai river, Ak-Terek River, and Tuura-Suu.

Climate
An average temperature in January is -4°C in valleys, and -16°C in mountains. In July, an average temperature varies from +18°C in valleys, to +10°C in mountains. An absolute recorded temperature minimum is -30°. Average maximum temperatures are +30°C in valleys, and +15°C in mountains. Average yearly precipitation is 200-300 mm in valleys, and 300-400 mm in mountains. An average snow cover is up to 10 cm. Almost no snow cover was observed near Balykchy. The maximum wind reaches 45 m/s once in 20 years.

Population

Populated places
In total, Tong District includes 30 villages located in nine rural communities. Each rural community can consist of one or several villages. The rural communities and settlements in the Tong District are:

 Ak-Terek (seat: Kara-Koo; incl. Ala-Bash, Bar-Bulak, Döng-Talaa, Komsomol and Kyzyl-Tuu)
 Bolot Mambetov (seat: Eshperov; incl. Ak-Say, Jer-Üy and Kök-Say)
 Kajy-Say (seat: Kajy-Say)
 Kök-Moynok (seat: Ak-Ölöng; incl. Kök-Moynok-1 and Kök-Moynok-2)
 Köl-Tör (seat: Toguz-Bulak; incl. Köl-Tör and Kongur-Ölöng)
 Kün-Chygysh (seat: Bökönbaev; incl. Archaly)
 Tong (seat: Tong; incl. Kajy-Saz and Ak-Say)
 Tört-Kül (seat: Tört-Kül, incl. Temir-Kanat and Tuura-Suu)
 Ulakol (seat: Ottuk; incl. Kara-Talaa, Kara-Shaar, Tuura-Suu and Shor-Bulak)
Note: Balykchy is a town of regional significance of Issyk-Kul Region, and is not part of the Tong District.

References 

Districts of Issyk-Kul Region